Christopher M. Maslanka (born 27 October 1954) is a British writer and broadcaster, specialising in puzzles and problem solving.

He was born in Clapham, London, but was brought up by his uncle and aunt in Lowdham, Nottingham. He was educated at The Becket School, Nottingham, where he was a successful chess player, and went on to study physics at St Catherine's College, Oxford.

His first book – The Pyrgic Puzzler – a collection of 80 puzzles with illustrations by Michael Harrington, was written without any particular view to publication, but was taken up by Iris Murdoch who wrote an introduction for it in which she said that although she's not a great solver of puzzles, the book may be 'read as literature' just as in the case of Wittgenstein's Tractatus Logico-Philosophicus and the Bible.

He was invited by Alan Rusbridger to submit puzzles to Weekend Guardian and his two puzzle columns: Wordplay and Pyrgic Puzzles have appeared in the Saturday edition of the newspaper for 20 years. Maslanka is also the quizmaster for New Humanist magazine.

A book interview with David Freeman at BBC Radio Oxford led to Maslanka's contributing anecdotes and puzzles to many programmes and in 1992-3 he co-hosted the Saturday afternoon show PDQ 95.2 with Andrew Peach. 
He was also invited by the World Service to broadcast his humorous puzzle anecdotes to the hostages during the Gulf War.

Maslanka designed the puzzles for Harry Horse's 1996 computer game, Drowned God.

He presented the BBC Radio 4 programme Puzzle Panel which was broadcast between 1998 and 2005.

He has retained his association with St Catherine's College, Oxford who have created a special post for him, that of a  "College Enigmatist".

In 2018, he presented a radio series for BBC Radio 4 on the history of puzzling, entitled Two Thousand Years of Puzzling.

Bibliography
Christopher Maslanka: The Pyrgic Puzzler: Classic Conundrums, 1987, Kingswood. 
Christopher Maslanka: Professor Percival Pinkerton's Most Perplexing Puzzles, 1989, Meadowbrook Press. 
Christopher Maslanka: Guardian Book of Puzzles, 1990, Fourth Estate Ltd. 
Christopher Maslanka: Mind Olympics, 1993, The Puzzle Club. 
Christopher Maslanka: The Little Book of Puzzles, 1995, The Puzzle Club. 
Christopher Maslanka: The Pyrgic Puzzler: Classic Conundrums, 2011, Dover Publications.

References

External links
 Chris Maslanka's home page

Alumni of St Catherine's College, Oxford
British radio personalities
British people of Polish descent
1954 births
Living people
Puzzle designers
People from Lowdham